Glencoe (local pronunciation "Glin-ko") is a city in Calhoun and Etowah counties in the U.S. state of Alabama. It is part of the Gadsden Metropolitan Statistical Area. The city incorporated in 1939. The population was 5,160 at the 2010 census.

Geography
Glencoe is located at 33°57'11.333" North, 85°56'9.125" West (33.953148, -85.935868).

Demographics

2000 census
As of the census of 2000, there were 5,152 people, 2,000 households, and 1,526 families living in the city. The racial makeup of the city was 96.93% White, 1.73% Black or African American, 0.29% Native American, 0.17% Asian, 0.02% Pacific Islander, 0.10% from other races, and 0.76% from two or more races. 0.35% of the population were Hispanic or Latino of any race.

There were 2,000 households, out of which 32.2% had children under the age of 18 living with them, 63.7% were married couples living together, 9.1% had a female householder with no husband present, and 23.8% were non-families. 21.9% of all households were made up of individuals, and 10.1% had someone living alone who was 65 years of age or older. The average household size was 2.48 and the average family size was 2.89.

In the city, the age distribution of the population shows 22.2% under the age of 18, 7.3% from 18 to 24, 27.7% from 25 to 44, 25.3% from 45 to 64, and 17.5% who were 65 years of age or older. The median age was 41 years. For every 100 females, there were 92.2 males. For every 100 females age 18 and over, there were 89.3 males.

The median income for a household in the city was $38,385, and the median income for a family was $46,283. Males had a median income of $31,893 versus $26,652 for females. The per capita income for the city was $18,577. About 4.9% of families and 6.7% of the population were below the poverty line, including 8.0% of those under age 18 and 7.2% of those age 65 or over.

2010 census
As of the census of 2010, there were 5,160 people, 2,129 households, and 1,488 families living in the city. There were 2,270 housing units at an average density of 133.5 per square mile (51/km). The racial makeup of the city was 96.5% White, 1.3% Black or African American, 0.3% Native American, 0.5% Asian, 0.0% Pacific Islander, 0.2% from other races, and 1.1% from two or more races. 0.8% of the population were Hispanic or Latino of any race.

There were 2,129 households, out of which 25.3% had children under the age of 18 living with them, 55.5% were married couples living together, 10.1% had a female householder with no husband present, and 30.1% were non-families. 26.6% of all households were made up of individuals, and 12.8% had someone living alone who was 65 years of age or older. The average household size was 2.42 and the average family size was 2.92.

In the city, the age distribution of the population shows 21.2% under the age of 18, 8.4% from 18 to 24, 23.2% from 25 to 44, 30.1% from 45 to 64, and 17.2% who were 65 years of age or older. The median age was 42.7 years. For every 100 females, there were 96.0 males. For every 100 females age 18 and over, there were 101.0 males.

The median income for a household in the city was $53,279, and the median income for a family was $61,810. Males had a median income of $53,295 versus $31,481 for females. The per capita income for the city was $24,531. About 3.5% of families and 5.2% of the population were below the poverty line, including 6.7% of those under age 18 and 5.8% of those age 65 or over.

2020 census

As of the 2020 United States census, there were 5,372 people, 1,949 households, and 1,384 families residing in the city.

Notable persons
 Shannon Camper, Miss Alabama 2004
 Jana Sanderson, Miss Alabama 2000

References

External links
City of Glencoe official website

Cities in Alabama
Cities in Etowah County, Alabama
Cities in Calhoun County, Alabama